Spectrofon was an electronic magazine for ZX Spectrum produced in Russia by the developer group STEP Interactive from Moscow. The magazine appeared on a monthly basis, and 23 issues were published in total. The issues were stored on a (usually well-protected) FDD and included both text and program part. There were several "columns" which appeared almost in every issue (solutions, game announcements, cheat codes and memory pokes). Every issue had its own unique custom-written shell, with graphical and music effects. In every issue had as supplement 2-3 (usually not widely known) games or utilities in full versions.

The magazine was the first electronic magazine in Russian and became very popular. There were several attempts to produce similar electronic magazines, like Adventurer, Deja Vu, Speccy, ZX Format, and ZX Guide, but they did not enjoy the same popularity as Spectrofon.

References

1994 establishments in Russia
1996 disestablishments in Russia
Defunct computer magazines
Defunct magazines published in Russia
Magazines established in 1994
Magazines disestablished in 1996
Magazines published in Moscow
Computer magazines published in Russia
Russian-language magazines
Monthly magazines published in Russia
ZX Spectrum software
ZX Spectrum magazines